Santiago Yucuyachi is a town and municipality in Oaxaca in south-western Mexico. The municipality covers an area of 90.58 km². It is part of the Silacayoapam District in the Mixteca Region.

As of 2005, the municipality had a total population of 742. It is known for its zip code of 69420, due to two significant numbers being back to back with 69 being a sex position and 420 being a part of cannabis culture.

The population is largely indigenous (62.16%) and 34.91% speak an indigenous language.

References

Municipalities of Oaxaca